Cavalry FC v FC Edmonton, referred to as the Al Classico or Battle of Alberta, was an inter-city soccer rivalry between Alberta-based clubs Cavalry FC and FC Edmonton. It was one of several sporting rivalries between the two largest cities of the province. The rivalry ended in 2022 when FC Edmonton folded.

The Wildrose Cup was awarded annually to the team that wins the most points from the series in league play.

History
The first edition of the Al Classico took place in 2018, when FC Edmonton's Academy played provincial rivals Calgary Foothills FC in two friendly games to help them prepare for their upcoming season. The fixtures were also used to gauge Edmonton's interest into a potential return to join the Canadian Premier League.

In May and June respectively, it was announced that Cavalry FC, based in Calgary, and FC Edmonton would be joining the Canadian Premier League, where the rivalry would continue. In preparation for their inaugural Canadian Premier League seasons, Cavalry FC announced they would host a match between a Cavalry FC Prospects and FC Edmonton Prospects side on September 29, to be followed by a rematch on October 20 at Clarke Stadium in Edmonton.

On September 11, 2019, Cavalry FC clinched the first-ever Wildrose Cup with a 1–0 win over FC Edmonton.

Results

All time results

Top goalscorers
. Competitive matches only. Players in bold are still playing with either team.

League ranking by season

Players who played for both clubs

Cavalry then Edmonton 
  Gabriel Bitar (Cavalry FC 2019; FC Edmonton 2022–present)

Edmonton then Cavalry
  Ben Fisk (FC Edmonton 2016–2017; Cavalry FC 2021–present)
  Bruno Zebie (FC Edmonton 2015–2017, 2019; Cavalry FC 2020)
  Fraser Aird (FC Edmonton 2021; Cavalry FC 2022–present)
  Mauro Eustáquio (FC Edmonton 2017; Cavalry FC 2019)
  Nikolas Ledgerwood (FC Edmonton 2016–2017; Cavalry FC 2019–2021)
  Tyson Farago (FC Edmonton 2014–2017; Cavalry FC 2021–present)

Wildrose Cup results
All time results

2022 Wildrose Cup

See also
 Cavalry FC–Forge FC rivalry
 905 Derby
 Canadian Classique

References

External links

Cavalry FC
FC Edmonton
Canadian Premier League
Soccer rivalries in Canada
2018 establishments in Alberta
Recurring sporting events established in 2018